Butte Valley may refer to:
Butte Valley, California
Butte Valley Township, Benson County, North Dakota
Butte Valley Airport
Butte Valley National Grassland